Lasem Cheshmeh (also Romanized as Lāsem Cheshmeh; also known as Lāsem Cheshmeh-ye Bālā, Lām Cheshmeh, Lasein, and Lāsim) is a village in Shahrabad Rural District, in the Central District of Firuzkuh County, Tehran Province, Iran. At the 2006 census, its population was 104, in 30 families.

References 

Populated places in Firuzkuh County